Artas may refer to:

People

 Arta Kamuio, the father of Kharaosta Kamuio, an ancient Asian people
 Artas (ruler of Messapia)

Locations

 Artas, Bethlehem, a Palestinian village in the West Bank
 Artas, Isère, a commune of the Isère département, in France
 Artas, South Dakota, a place in the United States

Other

 ARTAS (software), Air Traffic Management (ATM) suRveillance Tracker And Server of EUROCONTROL